or  is a lake that lies in the southeastern part of the municipality of Bindal in Nordland county, Norway.

See also
 List of lakes in Norway
 Geography of Norway

References

Lakes of Nordland
Bindal